In Greek mythology, Antitheus (Ancient Greek: Ἀντίθεον means "equal to the gods, godlike") was one of the Achaean soldiers who was killed by the Amazon queen, Penthesilea.

Note

References 

 Quintus Smyrnaeus, The Fall of Troy translated by Way. A. S. Loeb Classical Library Volume 19. London: William Heinemann, 1913. Online version at theio.com
 Quintus Smyrnaeus, The Fall of Troy. Arthur S. Way. London: William Heinemann; New York: G.P. Putnam's Sons. 1913. Greek text available at the Perseus Digital Library.

Achaeans (Homer)